Central Plaza is a 78-storey,  skyscraper completed in August 1992 at 18 Harbour Road, in Wan Chai on Hong Kong Island in Hong Kong. It is the third tallest tower in the city after 2 International Finance Centre in Central and the ICC in West Kowloon. It was the tallest building in Asia from 1992 to 1996, until the Shun Hing Square was built in Shenzhen, a neighbouring city. Central Plaza surpassed the Bank of China Tower as the tallest building in Hong Kong until the completion of 2 IFC.

Central Plaza was also the tallest reinforced concrete building in the world, until it was surpassed by CITIC Plaza, Guangzhou. The building uses a triangular floor plan. On the top of the tower is a four-bar neon clock that indicates the time by displaying different colours for 15-minute periods, blinking at the change of the quarter.

It also houses the world's highest church inside a skyscraper, Sky City Church.

History
The land upon which Central Plaza sits was reclaimed from Victoria Harbour in the 1970s. The  site was auctioned off by the Hong Kong Government at City Hall Theatre on 25 January 1989. It was sold for a record HK$3.35 billion to a joint venture called "Cheer City Properties", owned 50 per cent by Sun Hung Kai Properties and 50 per cent by fellow real estate conglomerate Sino Land and their major shareholder the Ng Teng Fong family. A third developer, Ryoden Development, joined the consortium afterward. Ryoden Development disposed its 5% interest for 190,790 square feet of office space in New Kowloon Plaza from Sun Hung Kai in 1995.

The first major tenant to sign a lease was the Provisional Airport Authority, who on 2 August 1991 agreed to lease the 24th to 26th floors. A topping-out ceremony, presided over by Sir David Ford, was held on 9 April 1992.

Design

Central Plaza is made up of two principal components: a free standing  office tower and a  podium block attached to it. The tower is made up of three sections: a  tower base forming the main entrance and public circulation spaces; a  tower body containing 57 office floors, a sky lobby and five mechanical plant floors; and the tower top consists of six mechanical plant floors and a  tower mast.

The ground level public area along with the public sitting out area form an  landscaped garden with fountain, trees and artificial stone paving. No commercial element is included in the podium. The first level is a public thoroughfare for three pedestrian bridges linking the Mass Transit Railway, the Convention and Exhibition Centre and the China Resource Building. By turning these space to public use, the building got 20% plot ratio more as bonus. The shape of the tower is not truly triangular but with its three corners cut off to provide better internal office spaces.

Central Plaza was designed by the Hong Kong architectural firm Ng Chun Man and Associates and engineered by Arup. The main contractor was a joint venture, comprising the contracting firms Sanfield (a subsidiary of Sun Hung Kai) and Tat Lee, called Manloze Ltd.

Design constraints

Triangular shaped floor plan
The building was designed to be triangular in shape because it would allow 20% more of the office area to enjoy the harbour view as compared with a square or rectangular shaped buildings.
Nonetheless, the triangular building plan causes the air handling unit (AHU) room in the internal core to also assume a triangular configuration. With only limited space, this makes the adoption of a standard AHU not feasible. Furthermore, all air-conditioning ducting, electrical trunking and piping gathered inside the core area has to be squeezed into a very narrow and congested corridor ceiling void.

Super high-rise building
As the building is situated opposite to the Hong Kong Convention and Exhibition Centre, the only way to get more sea view for the building and not be obstructed by the neighbouring high-rise buildings is to build it tall enough. However, a tall building brings a lot of difficulties to structural and building services design, for example, excessive system static pressure for water systems, high line voltage drop and long distance of vertical transportation. All these problems can increase the capital cost of the building systems and impair the safety operation of the building.

Maximum clear ceiling height
However, because of high windload in Hong Kong for such a super high-rise building, every increase in building height by a metre would increase the structural cost by more than HK$1 million (HK$304,800 per ft). With this issue alone, an estimated construction cost saving for a total of 58 office floors, would be around HK$30 million.

Structural constraints

In the original brief, a 6-storey basement is required, therefore a diaphragm wall design came out.
The keyword to this project is time. With a briefing in a limited detail, the structural engineer needed to start work The diaphragm wall design allowed for the basement to be constructed by the top-down method. It allows the superstructure to be constructed at the same time as the basement, thereby removing time-consuming basement construction period from the critical path.
Wind loading is another major design criterion in Hong Kong as it is situated in an area influenced by typhoons. Not only must the structure be able to resist the loads generally and the cladding system and its fixings resist higher local loads, but the building must also perform dynamically in an acceptable manner such that predicted movements lie within acceptable standards of occupant comfort criteria. To ensure that all aspects of the building's performance in strong winds will be acceptable, a detailed wind tunnel study was carried out by Professor Alan Davenport at the Boundary Layer Wind Tunnel Laboratory at the University of Western Ontario.

Steel structure vs reinforced concrete
Steel structure is more commonly adopted in high-rise building. In the original scheme, an externally cross-braced framed tube was applied with primary/secondary beams carrying metal decking with reinforced concrete slab. The core was also of steelwork, designed to carry vertical load only. Later after a financial review by the developer, they decided to reduce the height of the superstructure by increasing the size of the floor plate so as to reduce the complex architectural requirements of the tower base which means a highstrength concrete solution became possible.

In the final scheme, columns at  centres and  floor edge beams were used to replace the large steel corner columns. As climbing form and table form construction method and efficient construction management are used in this project which make this reinforced concrete structure take no longer construction time than the steel structure. And the most attractive point is that the reinforced concrete scheme can save HK$230 million compared to that of steel structure. Hence the reinforced concrete structure was adopted and Central Plaza is now one of the tallest reinforced concrete buildings in the world.

In the reinforced concrete structure scheme, the core has a similar arrangement to the steel scheme and the wind shear is taken out from the core at the lowest basement level and transferred to the perimeter diaphragm walls. In order to reduce large shear reversals in the core walls in the basement, and at the top of the tower base level, the ground floor, basement levels 1 and 2 and the 5th and 6th floors, the floor slabs and beams are separated horizontally from the core walls.

Another advantage of using reinforced concrete structure is that it is more flexible to cope with changes in structural layout, sizes and height according to the site conditions by using table form system.

Trivia

This skyscraper was visited in the seventh leg of the reality TV show The Amazing Race 2, which described Central Plaza as "the tallest building in Hong Kong". Although contestants were told to reach the top floor, the actual task was performed on the 46th floor.

See also

 List of tallest buildings in Hong Kong
 List of buildings and structures in Hong Kong
 List of tallest freestanding structures

References

External links

 
 Architectural study of the building
 Hong Kong's skyscrapers in comparison
 Central Plaza Elevator Layout

Office buildings completed in 1992
Skyscraper office buildings in Hong Kong
Sun Hung Kai Properties
Wan Chai North
Ove Arup buildings and structures
Triangular buildings